Osman Çelik (born 27 November 1991 in Antalya, Turkey) is a Turkish footballer who plays as a defensive midfielder or centre-back for Samsunspor.

Career
Çelik is a youth product of the youth academy of Antalyaspor, and began his senior career with Kepez Belediyespor in 2011. He returned to Antalyaspor in 2012, going on successive loans to Kepez Belediyespor and Manavgatspor, before signing permanently with the latter. He once more returned to Antalyaspor in 2014 where he played in the Süper Lig, with loans in between at Karabükspor. He transferred to BB Erzurumspor in 2021 where he played for 2 years. On 1 July 2021, he transferred to Samsunspor, signing a 2+1 year agreement.

References

External links
 
 
 Soccerway Profile

Living people
1991 births
Turkish footballers
Association football midfielders
People from Antalya
Antalyaspor footballers
Kardemir Karabükspor footballers
Büyükşehir Belediye Erzurumspor footballers
Samsunspor footballers
Süper Lig players
TFF First League players